Carmelito was a planned settlement, initially called Point Lobos City, on Point Lobos in Monterey County, California It was located just north of Carmel Highlands and about  south of Carmel on Highway 1. Located on the former Rancho San Jose y Sur Chiquito, the Carmelo Land and Coal Company planned the subdivision in 1890 when their coal mine on nearby Malpaso Creek proved to be unprofitable. They subdivided the land into 1,000 parcels and began selling lots for $25 to $50. The lack of a bridge across the Carmel River and two national economic recessions during the 1890s combined to severely restrict sales. Only a few small cabins were built.

History 

Alexander M. Allan, a successful race track architect and real estate developer from Illinois, purchased  of Point Lobos from the Carmelo Land and Coal Company in 1898. Allan and his wife Satie appreciated the natural beauty of the point and were concerned about the growing number of visitors who wanted to see the rare Monterey Cypress trees and scenic coastline. They put up toll gates, prohibited camping, and  charged visitors 50 cents a vehicle (about $10 today) to enter the point. Allan bought the lots that had been subdivided and later got the subdivisions removed from the county record. Eunice Riley, Alexander's daughter, repurchased the last subdivided lots in the 1950s.

Conversion to reserve 

By the mid-1920s, the Save the Redwoods League was actively involved in an effort to preserve the Monterey Cypress. They hired the internationally known landscape architect, Frederick Law Olmsted, to research Point Lobos and report on the areas most noteworthy of preservation. Olmsted's report described Point Lobos as "the most outstanding example on the coast of California of picturesque rock and surf scenery in combination with unique vegetation, including typical Monterey Cypress."

In 1933, three years after Alexander Allan's death, the State of California bought  from the Allan family for $631,000 and established the Point Lobos State Natural Reserve. The Allan family donated to the state an additional  of cypress-covered headlands at the western tip of the point as a memorial grove to Alexander and Satie Allan.

References

Former settlements in Monterey County, California
Big Sur
Ranchos of Monterey County, California